In Greek mythology, Phineus (/ˈfɪniəs, ˈfɪn.juːs/; Ancient Greek: Φινεύς) was a son of Belus by Anchinoe and thus brother to Aegyptus, Danaus and Cepheus.

Mythology 
Phineus had been engaged to Cepheus' daughter Andromeda before she wed Perseus, and Phineus plotted against him, leading Perseus to turn him and his co-conspirators into stone by showing them the head of Medusa. The affair appears to have formed part of Euripides' lost Andromeda, but the sole extensive ancient treatment is found Ovid's Metamorphoses.

In Ovid's account Perseus asked for Andromeda's hand in return for saving the girl from the sea-monster Cetus to whom an oracle had ordained Andromeda be sacrificed as punishment for her mother Cassiopeia's boast that she was more beautiful than the Nereids. Perseus was successful, but as he recounted his deeds to the court of Cepheus a spear-brandishing Phineus assailed him:

Phineus' presumed motive in marrying Andromeda was to strengthen his claim to the throne, rather than any interest in the girl herself.  Cepheus scolded his brother for this outburst, pointing out that he had done nothing to help Andromeda in the crisis, but Phineus still cast his spear at Perseus. Although he missed, a fierce battle ensued in which many fell until Perseus, surrounded by a large number of warriors, held up the head of the Gorgon, turning enemies still alive but Phineus to stone. Amazed by this, Phineus pleaded for his life with his gaze averted, but Perseus approached him and held the head before his eyes, turning Phineus to stone.

References

Bibliography
 .
 .
 .
 Pseudo-Apollodorus, Apollodorus, The Library, with an English Translation by Sir James George Frazer, F.B.A., F.R.S. in 2 Volumes. Cambridge, MA, Harvard University Press; London, William Heinemann Ltd. 1921.

Characters in Greek mythology
Metamorphoses characters
Metamorphoses into inanimate objects in Greek mythology